Lat Kumeh (also Romanized as Lat Kūmeh; also known as Lat Kohneh) is a village in Tuskacheshmeh Rural District, in the Central District of Galugah County, Mazandaran Province, Iran. At the 2006 census, its population was 189, in 37 families.

References 

Populated places in Galugah County